Orlanda was a cargo ship that was built in 1920 by F Krupp AG, Emden for German owners. She was seized by the Allies in Hamburg, in May 1945, passed to the Ministry of War Transport (MoWT) and renamed Empire Conington. In 1946, she was allocated to the Newfoundland Government. In 1949, she was sold to Panama and renamed Alabe. She served until 1958, when she was scrapped.

Description
The ship was built in 1920 by F Krupp, AG, Emden.

The ship had a GRT of 1,288 and a NRT of 628.

The engine was built by Krupp.

History
Orlanda was built for Rhederei AG von 1896, Hamburg. In 1927, she was sold to Hanseatische Dampschiffs Gesellschaft, Hamburg. Her port of registry was Hamburg. The Code Letters RBCV were allocated. On 20 November 1932, Orlanda ran aground at Mannskar, Finland whilst on a voyage from Vaasa to Mäntyluoto, Finland. She was refloated without assistance. In 1933, Orlanda was sold to Argo Reederei AG, Bremen. Her Code Letters were changed to DHSO in 1934. Argo Reederei AG became Argo Reederei Richard Adler & Co in 1937. In May 1945, Orlanda was seized by the Allies at Hamburg. She was passed to the MoWT and renamed Empire Conington. She was placed under the management of G Gibson & Co Ltd. Her port of registry was changed to London. The Code Letters GMYP and United Kingdom Official Number 180676 were allocated.

In 1946, Empire Conington was allocated to the Government of Newfoundland. She was operated by the Railways and Steamships Department. In 1949, Empire Conington was sold to Société Anonyme Maritime et Commerciale, Panama and was renamed Alabe. She served until 1958 when she was scrapped in Sunderland, United Kingdom.

References

1920 ships
Ships built in Emden
Steamships of Germany
Merchant ships of Germany
World War II merchant ships of Germany
Ministry of War Transport ships
Empire ships
Steamships of the United Kingdom
Merchant ships of the United Kingdom
Steamships of Canada
Merchant ships of Canada
Steamships of Panama
Merchant ships of Panama